Broad Street Presbyterian Church is a Grade II listed former Presbyterian church, and later Second Church of Christ Scientist, on Broad Street, Birmingham, England.

History
The foundation stone was laid on 24 July 1848 by Charles Cowan MP and the church opened in 1849. Some restoration work was undertaken in 1859.

By the early 20th century, the church was not prospering, and in 1914 there was a proposal to turn it into a cinema.

In 1929 the building was acquired by the Second Church of Christ Scientist. Since closure it has been used as a nightclub.

Organ
The church had a pipe organ by Brindley and Foster. A specification of the organ can be found on the National Pipe Organ Register.

References

Churches completed in 1849
Presbyterian churches in England
1849 establishments in England
Grade II listed churches in Birmingham